The 1941 Ohio Bobcats football team was an American football team that represented Ohio University as an independent during the 1941 college football season. In their 18th season under head coach Don Peden, the Bobcats compiled a 5–2–1 record and outscored opponents by a total of 108 to 42. The team played its home games at Ohio Stadium (later renamed Peden Stadium) in Athens, Ohio.

Schedule

References

Ohio
Ohio Bobcats football seasons
Ohio Bobcats football